Velluva Koroth Vismaya (born 14 May 1997) is an Indian sprinter who specializes in the 400 metres. She was part of the Indian women's 4 × 400 metres relay team that won the gold medal at the 2018 Asian Games. At the 2019 Asian Athletics Championships, she won silver in the women's 4 x 400 metres relay and silver in the mixed 4 x 400 metres relay.

The quartet of Vismaya, Muhammed Anas, Noah Nirmal Tom and Jisna Mathew competed in the 4 × 400 metres mixed team relay at the 2019 World Athletics Championships in Doha, where they clocked 3:16.14 in the heats to qualify for the final and secure a place at the 2020 Summer Olympics..The team finished seventh in the finals of the world athletics championships with a timing of 3:15: 77  .

She won the gold medal in 400m at the 59th National Open Athletics Championships held in October 2019.

References

External links
 

1997 births
Living people
Athletes from Kerala
People from Kannur district
Indian female sprinters
Sportswomen from Kerala
Athletes (track and field) at the 2018 Asian Games
Asian Games gold medalists for India
Asian Games medalists in athletics (track and field)
Medalists at the 2018 Asian Games